Sky Runner is a 1986 game for MS-DOS, Commodore 64 and ZX Spectrum made by Cascade. The MS-DOS version uses CGA graphics.

The game is played from the 3rd person perspective with a 3D view similar to Space Harrier. Gameplay involved controlling an aircraft called a skimmer to shoot down enemy towers. After destroying enough, the skimmer would drop down a skybike, which the player would use to destroy other enemy skybikers, while avoiding obstacles like trees. After destroying enough enemies, a boss character called a harvester would appear, which the player would have to defeat. Upon defeating the harvester the game awards the player with money, and loops back to the player controlling the skimmer.

Plot
Taken from the game's manual:

References

1986 video games
Commodore 64 games
DOS games
Rail shooters
ZX Spectrum games
Video games developed in the United Kingdom